The Opal Creek Wilderness is a wilderness area located in the Willamette National Forest in the U.S. state of Oregon, on the border of the Mount Hood National Forest.  It has the largest uncut watershed in Oregon.

Opal Creek and nearby Opal Lake were named for Opal Elliott, wife of early Forest Service ranger Roy Elliott.

Geography and ecology 
In addition, the  Bull of the Woods Wilderness in the Mount Hood National Forest shares its southern boundary with the Opal Creek Wilderness.

The Opal Creek Valley contains 50 waterfalls and five lakes. Eight hiking trails, remnants of the early day prospecting and fire access routes, total . The valley forms the largest intact stand of old-growth forest in the western Cascades, and 500- to 1000-year-old trees are common. The most abundant trees are Douglas fir, Pacific silver fir, and western hemlock. Common hardwoods include bigleaf maple and red alder. Understory vegetation includes huckleberry, vine maple and rhododendron.

History 
The wilderness was designated on September 30, 1996, after a nearly 20-year battle to protect the area from logging and mining. In 1980, the District Ranger of the Detroit Ranger District, Dave Alexander, vowed to "cut Opal Creek." By late 1981, clearcut boundary markers were placed. Lawsuits were filed, Wild and Scenic Rivers were designated, and multiple bills to protect the area failed, including an attempt to make it a state park. When books and photo essays were published in the early 1990s, national attention was brought to the area.
Finally, in 1996, after working with all stakeholders, including environmental groups, local communities and representatives of the timber industry, to draft consensus legislation, United States Senator Mark Hatfield obtained passage of expansive legislation to protect Opal Creek.

2020 Beachie Creek Fire 
The Opal Creek Wilderness is within the burn zone of the Beachie Creek Fire that began approximately two miles south of Jawbone Flats on August 16, 2020, one of several major wildfires on the West Coast that summer. As of September 2020, the severity of the damage within the wilderness is unknown.

See also 
 List of old growth forests
 List of Oregon Wildernesses
 List of U.S. Wilderness Areas
 Wilderness Act

References

External links

Opal Creek Ancient Forest Center
Forests and Global Warming - Oregon Wild

Protected areas of Clackamas County, Oregon
Protected areas of Marion County, Oregon
Wilderness areas of Oregon
Old-growth forests
Willamette National Forest
1996 establishments in Oregon
Protected areas established in 1996